Charles Palmer, later Charles FitzRoy, 2nd Duke of Cleveland, 1st Duke of Southampton, KG, Chief Butler of England (18 June 1662 – 9 September 1730), styled Baron Limerick before 1670 and Earl of Southampton between 1670 and 1675 and known as The Duke of Southampton from 1675 until 1709 when he succeeded his mother to the dukedom of Cleveland.

Early life
He was the third eldest of the illegitimate sons of King Charles II of England, Scotland and Ireland, his mother being Barbara Villiers, later 1st Duchess of Cleveland, then the wife of Roger Palmer, 1st Earl of Castlemaine. In recognition of his legal father the Earl of Castlemaine, he was styled from birth by the courtesy title Lord Limerick, one of the Earl's lesser titles. His birth marked the separation of his legal parents; Lord Castlemaine, a Roman Catholic, had him christened in the Roman Catholic faith but six days later the King had him re-christened in the Church of England.

Personal life
In 1670, at the age of eight, he was betrothed to Mary Wood, only child and sole heiress of Sir Henry Wood, 1st Baronet, Clerk of the Green Cloth, but with the proviso that the marriage be delayed until Mary was aged sixteen. Following the death of her father, the Duchess of Cleveland more or less abducted Mary, with the intention of bringing her up with her own children. In 1675, he was created Duke of Southampton along with the subsidiary titles of Earl of Chichester and Baron Newbury. The marriage to Mary Wood took place in 1679, but within months the new Duchess had died of smallpox, leaving no children of the marriage.

In 1694, the Duke married secondly Anne, a daughter of Sir William Pulteney, of Misterton, Leicestershire, and they had six children:
Lady Grace, born 28 March 1697, married in 1725 Henry Vane, later created Earl of Darlington
William FitzRoy, 3rd Duke of Cleveland and 2nd Duke of Southampton (19 February 1698 – 18 May 1774)
Lord Charles Fitzroy (13 February 1698 – 31 July 1723)
Lord Henry Fitzroy (17 August 1701 – 1709)
Lady Anne, (12 November 1702 - 13 February 1769), married John Paddey, Esq.
Lady Barbara, died unmarried

On the death of his mother in 1709, the Duke became also second Duke of Cleveland, by a special remainder in the grant of the dukedom which set aside his illegitimacy.

He died on 9 September 1730 and was buried at Westminster Abbey. He was succeeded by his eldest son William FitzRoy (1698–1774), who died without issue, when all his titles became extinct.

References

Ancestry

 

1662 births
1730 deaths
17th-century English nobility
18th-century English people
House of Stuart
Dukes of Cleveland
Dukes of Southampton
Knights of the Garter
Illegitimate children of Charles II of England
Peers of England created by Charles II
Earls of Chichester
Burials at Westminster Abbey
Sons of kings